HD 108874 b is a gas giant announced in 2003. The orbit lies in the star's habitable zone. It is expected that any moons orbiting this planet are enriched in carbon, and are thus quite different from the silicate-rich bodies in the Solar System.
The planet is possibly in a 4 : 1 orbital resonance with HD 108874 c.

Discovery
The jovian planet HD 108874 b was discovered by the US-based team led by Paul Butler, Geoffrey Marcy, Steven Vogt, and Debra Fischer. A total of 20 radial velocity observations, obtained at the W. M. Keck Observatory in Hawaii between 1999 and 2002, were used to make the discovery.

See also
 HD 28185 b

References

External links
 

Coma Berenices
Exoplanets discovered in 2003
Giant planets
Giant planets in the habitable zone
Exoplanets detected by radial velocity